Mount St. Francis is an unincorporated community in southwestern Lafayette Township of Floyd County in the hills of the southern part of the U.S. state of Indiana, across the Ohio River from Louisville, Kentucky. Although Mount St. Francis is unincorporated, it has a post office, with the ZIP code of 47146. The post office was established in 1937.

A major feature in the Mount St. Francis area is a similarly named retreat center and a residence for members of the Conventual Franciscans, a religious community of Roman Catholic men. Mount Saint Francis is a multipurpose facility owned and administered by the Province of Our Lady of Consolation of the Conventual Franciscan Friars. The land was donated to the Franciscans by American actress Mary Anderson, and an arts center bearing her name is part of the Mount Saint Francis complex. Prior to the opening of the retreat center in 1975, the Conventual Franciscans operated a minor, or high-school seminary for young men. Graduates of this school were encouraged to continue their studies and become members of the Franciscan Order. The Mt. St. Francis Association of Former Students is a group consisting of alumni of the seminary, and holds a reunion at Mount St. Francis every two years. Anyone who ever taught at or attended the seminary is invited.

References

External links
Mary Anderson Center. 
Mt. St. Francis Center for Spirituality.

Catholic Church in Indiana
Unincorporated communities in Floyd County, Indiana
Unincorporated communities in Indiana
Louisville metropolitan area